Netechma napoana is a species of moth of the family Tortricidae. It is found in Napo Province, Ecuador.

The wingspan is 20 mm. The ground colour of the forewings is white with pale brownish suffusions and darker strigulation (fine streaks). The markings are rust brown. The hindwings are white cream, in the distal half of the wing suffused with brownish.

References

Moths described in 2009
Netechma